is a Japanese swimmer. She competed in the women's 4 × 100 metre freestyle relay event at the 2018 Asian Games, winning the gold medal.

References

External links
 

2000 births
Living people
Japanese female freestyle swimmers
Place of birth missing (living people)
Asian Games medalists in swimming
Asian Games gold medalists for Japan
Asian Games silver medalists for Japan
Swimmers at the 2018 Asian Games
Medalists at the 2018 Asian Games
Swimmers at the 2018 Summer Youth Olympics
Universiade medalists in swimming
Universiade silver medalists for Japan
Medalists at the 2019 Summer Universiade